Emanuela Salopek (born  18 April 1987 in Niš, SFR Yugoslavia) is a Croatian female basketball player. At the 2012 Summer Olympics, she competed for the Croatia women's national basketball team in the women's event. She is 5 ft 10 inches tall.

Career
  Montmontaža Zagreb (2005–2007), Gospić (2007–2010, 2012–2013), Šibenik (2010–2011), Novi Zagreb (2011–2012)
  Üniversitesi Kayseri Kaski (2013–2014)
  ASPTT Arras (2014–2015)

References

1987 births
Living people
Basketball players from Niš
Croatian women's basketball players
Croats of Serbia
Shooting guards
Olympic basketball players of Croatia
Basketball players at the 2012 Summer Olympics
ŽKK Gospić players
ŽKK Novi Zagreb players
ŽKK Šibenik players
Croatian Women's Basketball League players